The Center for Fiction, originally called the New York Mercantile Library, is a not-for-profit organization in New York City, with offices at 15 Lafayette Avenue in Fort Greene, Brooklyn. Prior to their move in early 2018, The Center for Fiction was located at 17 East 47th Street, between Madison and Fifth Avenues in Midtown Manhattan. The center works to promote fiction and literature and to give support to writers. It originated in 1820 as the (New York) Mercantile Library and in 2005 changed its name to the Mercantile Library Center for Fiction, although it presents itself as simply "The Center for Fiction".

The center, which is one of 17 remaining membership libraries in the United States, three of which are in New York City, maintains a large circulating library of 20th and 21st century fiction, in addition to many stored volumes of 19th century fiction. It also stocks non-fiction volumes on subjects related to literature. It maintains a Reading Room, operates a curated independent bookstore primarily featuring works of fiction, rents space to writers at low cost, and presents literary programs to the public. The organization also awards the annual Center for Fiction First Novel Prize.

Mercantile Library

1820–1853

The foundation of the Mercantile Library Association was instigated by the New York Chamber of Commerce, which placed newspaper advertisements in November 1820 asking merchant clerks to meet at a local coffee house to discuss forming an organization based on the Mercantile Library in Boston, which had been created earlier that year. The purpose of the new organization was to provide the city's growing population of clerks with an alternative to what were considered to be immoral entertainments and other vices of the city.

The association's first subscription circulating library, which had 700 volumes in rented rooms at 49 Fulton Street in Manhattan, was open to most of the general public, but only merchant clerks were allowed to vote for and be officers in the association. By the year 1826, the financial "prospects brightened to the extent that the officers hired a suite of rooms in the Harpers building on Cliff Street, and starting the reading room, which has continued to be an important part of the institution in all its successive homes.” In 1830, the library moved to a new building designed by architect Seth Geer, called Clinton Hall, at Nassau and Beekman Streets, which the Clinton Hall Association, made up of prominent members of the Mercantile Library Association, had raised funds to construct. Frequent lectures were presented by the library, including by Ralph Waldo Emerson  and Oliver Wendell Holmes, Sr.

By 1844 the library contained works of agriculture and gardening; amusements, games, sports &c; anecdotes, facetiae, table talk &c; Anglo Saxon language &c; antiquities, heraldry, mythology, and numismatics; architecture; arts and sciences; astronomy; banking and currency; bibliography and typography; biography; book keeping; botany; chemistry; commerce; conchology; dictionaries and lexicons; domestic economy; dramatic literature; education; electricity and magnetism; essays and literary miscellanies; fine arts; geography; geology and mineralogy; history; language; law; letters; mathematics; medicine; metaphysics; miscellaneous works; moral science; music; natural history; natural philosophy; novels; novels in foreign languages; orations, speeches and addresses; periodicals; phrenology; poetry; political economy; political science; religion; rhetoric, oratory and criticism; Shakspeare; slavery; voyages and travels; Africa, America, Asia, China, Egypt, England, Europe, France, Germany, Greece, India, Ireland, Italy, London, Rome, Russia, Scandinavia, Scotland, Spain and Portugal, Switzerland.

Among its newspaper subscriptions in 1844 were the Churchman, Evening Post, Examiner, Journal of Commerce, Morning Courier, New York American, New York Commercial Advertiser, New York Evangelist, New York Observer, New York Tribune, Niles Weekly Register, and Noticioso de Ambos Mundos. Among the library's magazine subscriptions in 1844 were: Ainsworth's Magazine, American Journal of Science and the Arts, American Phrenological Journal, American Rail Road Journal, Annals and Magazine of Natural History, Athenaeum, Bentley's Miscellany, Blackwood's Magazine, British and Foreign Review, Chambers's Edinburgh Journal, Chemical Gazette, Christian Examiner, Dublin University Magazine, Eclectic Museum of Foreign Literature, Eclectic Review, Edinburgh Review, Foreign Quarterly Review, Franklin Institute's Journal, Frazer's Magazine, Gardener's Magazine, Gentleman's Magazine, Graham's Magazine, Knickerbocker, Ladies Companion, The Mechanics' Magazine, Merchants Magazine, Metropolitan Magazine, Mirror, Nautical Magazine, New Monthly Magazine, Penny Magazine, Philosophical Magazine, Phrenological Journal, Quarterly Review, Repertory of Patent Inventions, Sailor's Magazine, Southern Literary Messenger, Tait's Edinburgh Magazine, United Service Journal, United States Magazine and Democratic Review, and Westminster Review.

In addition to reading materials, as of the 1850s the association owned "a cabinet of minerals and shells, a collection of revolutionary medals, miscellaneous coins, various paintings, statue of the 'Dancing Girl Reposing', Minerva, and a bust of Philip Stone.

1854-1960s
By 1853, the association had over 4,000 members and over 30,000 volumes, and in 1854, the library moved again, this time uptown to the Astor Opera House building on Lafayette Street between Astor Place and East 8th Street. The opera house had closed its doors as a result of the Astor Place riot of 1849, and the building was sold for $140,000 to the association, which renamed it "Clinton Hall" and moved the library there as a place which was more convenient to its members. At its new location, the association offered classes and public lectures, including by Frederick Douglass, William Thackeray, and Mark Twain, and functioned as a cultural center.

Membership during this period reached at least 12,000, while the library itself amassed 120,000 volumes, making it the largest circulating library in the United States at the time. By 1872 the library contained works of biography; history, geography and travels; literature; mathematics; medical science; mental and moral science; natural sciences; political science; the arts; and theology. However, because the library did not stay open late at night, its services were not generally available to the working class, a deficit which was remedied when the Cooper Union opened a block east on Astor Place: its reading room was open until 10 p.m.

In 1891, requiring more space, the association tore down the opera house and replaced it with an 11-story building designed by George E. Harney, which it also named "Clinton Hall". The new building featured a reading room on the top floor that was two stories high, and was to remain the headquarters for its library operations, which included 7 branches, until 1920, when it relocated to rented space. However, in 1932, the library once again had its own building, at 17 East 47th Street, designed by Henry Otis Chapman. Here, the association maintained its 230,000 volumes to serve 3,000 subscribers. The library at this time still had branches at 149 Broadway at Liberty Street and 598 Madison Avenue at 57th Street.

1970s–2000s

Membership in the library declined through the following decades, and the library sold off parts of its collection in the 1970s. "In 1971 the theological collection was sold, in 1977 the foreign language collection was sold." It also attempted a merger with Pace College, but this did not occur. By 1987 the library was in financial distress, and closed for the summer of 1987, and then indefinitely in 1989, at a time when its membership was only 375 people. The association subsequently reorganized and reopened, with a new focus on fiction and literature.

In 1998, the ground floor of the building was renovated by Beyer Blinder Belle. The library – colloquially known as "The Merc" – had considered moving to a new location in 2008, but subsequently decided to remain at its historic Midtown Manhattan location.

Center for Fiction, 2005–present
Since 2005 known as The Center for Fiction, the organization presents a diverse program of free or low-cost public events, featuring over 100 authors, translators, and critics each year. The center also offers reading groups and writing workshops, open to the public, led by writers and scholars.

In May 2018, the organization announced that it would be moving its headquarters to a new building in Downtown Brooklyn called Caesura and designed by Dattner Architects, a  The space includes a library, classrooms, a writers studio, an auditorium for 160 people, a bookstore and a cafe. The three-story building will be co-owned with the Mark Morris Dance Group and a real estate company, which will have their own spaces there. The Center for Fiction was designed by Julie Nelson, Partner at BKSK Architects LLP and opened in 2019.

Awards
The center bestows a number of awards annually:

 The Fadiman Medal honors a book by a living American author that "deserves renewed recognition and a wider readership".
 The Christopher Doheny Award goes to a writer of fiction or nonfiction, on the topic of serious illness, where the author has personal experience.
 The First Novel Prize is awarded to the best debut novel of the year. The 2014 winner was Tiphanie Yanique for Land of Love and Drowning. The 2015 winner was Viet Thanh Nguyen for The Sympathizer.
 Maxwell E. Perkins Award is a life-time award to an editor, publisher, or agent who has "discovered, nurtured, and championed" writers of fiction. Daniel Halpern received the award for 2015.

See also
Mercantile Library (disambiguation)
Mercantile Library Association (Boston, Massachusetts)
New York Public Library
Astor Library Building

References
Notes

Bibliography

Pascu, Elaine Weber.

Further reading
Issued by the Mercantile Library
  1836, 1917, etc.; 1843
 
 

Catalogues
 
 
 1844
 1856
 
 1869
 1872

About the Mercantile Library

External links

 
 

Libraries in Manhattan
Non-profit organizations based in New York City
Subscription libraries in the United States
Midtown Manhattan
2005 establishments in New York City